Markovo is a rural locality (a village) in Leskovskoye Rural Settlement, Vologodsky District, Vologda Oblast, Russia. The population was 34 as of 2002.

Geography 
The distance to Vologda is 23 km, to Leskovo is 8 km. Pochinok is the nearest rural locality.

References 

Rural localities in Vologodsky District